Gustav Zumsteg (11 October 1915 – 17 June 2005) was a Swiss art collector, silk merchant and owner of the restaurant Kronenhalle in Zurich.

Early life
Gustav Zumsteg was born in Zurich, to Hulda Zumsteg, owner of the Kronenhalle restaurant. He had an older sister, Hedi. His father died when Gustav was eight weeks old.

Professional life

Silk trading house Ludwig Abraham & Co
In 1931 he joined as an apprentice the silk trading house Ludwig Abraham & Co - a business founded in 1863 under the name Königsberger, Rüdenberg & Co. in Krefeld, Germany, and that moved to Zurich where Jakob Abraham became a partner in 1878. 

From 1936, Zumsteg lived in Paris, where he met the artists and couturiers personally. He also managed Abraham's Paris subsidiary from 1941 on, became the chief designer and in 1943 a partner in the company. In 1957 he met Yves Saint Laurent, whose collections were henceforth influenced by Zumsteg's designs and Abraham fabrics.

In 1968, after the resignation of Ludwig Abraham, Zumsteg became the sole proprietor and director of the silk company. He mainly focused on textiles for haute couture and began Abraham's collaboration with well known Parisian fashion houses — not just with Cristóbal Balenciaga but also Christian Dior, Hubert de Givenchy, Coco Chanel, and Emanuel Ungaro. Abraham's Ltd will become one of the major suppliers of fabrics to the house of Saint Laurent.

However, the company itself did not manufacture the silk fabrics. The production was outsourced to manufactories in France and Italy who implemented the work of Paris and Lyon based design teams led by Zumsteg.

From 1970s on, the market for Haute Couture has gradually vanished due to the global end-of-an-era changes with cheaper silk prints from Asia and the rising mass market with easier to care for fabrics that did not need tailoring. With design of prints for the high end of the ready-to-wear market, Zumsteg adjusted the business to the new situation.

By the 1990s, the silk company was operating at a loss, even after Zumsteg's injections from his personal fortune. After the 40-year collaboration with Abraham's longest client Yves Saint Laurent came to an end in 1995 and no successor to Zumsteg was found, Abraham's Ltd. ceased operations in 2002.

Restaurant "Kronenhalle" and art collecting
After the death of his mother, Hulda Zumsteg, in 1957, he took over the management of the restaurant Kronenhalle.

As an art collector until his death in 2005, he ensured that guests could dine in his Zurich restaurant surrounded by the works of world-famous artists -among others Joan Miró, Marc Chagall, Pierre Bonnard, Georges Braque, Alberto Giacometti and Jean Tinguely.

Further reading

References 

1915 births
2005 deaths
Swiss art collectors
20th-century Swiss businesspeople
People from Zürich